Poropteron is a genus of sea snail, a marine gastropod mollusk in the subfamily Ocenebrinae  of the family Muricidae, the murex snails or rock snails.

Species
 Poropteron debruini (Lorenz, 1989)
 Poropteron graagae (Coen, 1943)
 Poropteron multicornis (Houart, 1991)
 Poropteron quinquelobatus (G. B. Sowerby II, 1879)
 Poropteron transkeianus (Houart, 1991)
 Poropteron uncinarius (Lamarck, 1822)

References

External links
 Jousseaume, F. P. (1880). Division méthodique de la famille des Purpuridés. Le Naturaliste. 2(42): 335-338
  Jousseaume, F. (1882). Etude des Purpuridae et description d'espèces nouvelles. Revue et Magasin de Zoologie. ser. 3, 7: 314-348
  Barco, A.; Herbert, G.; Houart, R.; Fassio, G. & Oliverio, M. (2017). A molecular phylogenetic framework for the subfamily Ocenebrinae (Gastropoda, Muricidae). Zoologica Scripta. 46 (3): 322-335

Ocenebrinae
Gastropods described in 1880
Gastropod genera